South Solok Regency is a landlocked regency (kabupaten) of West Sumatra province, Indonesia. It covers an area of 3,346.20 km2, and had a population of 144,281 at the 2010 Census and 182,027 at the 2020 Census. The seat of the administration is the town of Padang Aro.

Administrative divisions

South Solok Regency is divided into seven districts (kecamatan), listed below with their areas and their populations at the 2010 Census and 2020 Census. The table also includes the locations of the district administrative centres.

References

External links 
  
 

Regencies of West Sumatra